Trude Raad (born 27 April 1990) is a deaf Norwegian track and field athlete. She generally competes in the discus throw and hammer throw events at the International competitions. Trude has represented Norway at the Deaflympics in 2009, 2013 and 2017 and has won 4 gold medals in her Deaflympic career. She was also a champion in the women's hammer throw event at the Deaflympics on 3 consecutive occasions (2009, 2013, 2017). She broke her own deaf world record in the women's hammer throw at the 2017 Summer Deaflympics with a distance of 66.35m, the previous best was 65.03m

Trude Raad currently holds the Deaflympic records for the women's hammer throw and discus throw events. She was awarded the ICSD Deaf Sportswoman of the Year award in 2008 for her performances in deaf athletics including Junior deaf world records set by her in 2009 at the women's hammer throw and discus throw events. She was also nominated for the ICSD Deaf Sportswoman of the Year award in 2009.

References

External links 
 
 Profile at allathletics.com
 Profile at European Athletics.com
 Profile at ICSD
 Profile at Deaflympics
 Deaflympic records for women's in Athletics

1990 births
Living people
People from Gloppen
Norwegian female discus throwers
Norwegian female hammer throwers
Deaf competitors in athletics
Norwegian deaf people
Deaflympic athletes of Norway
Deaflympic gold medalists for Norway
Athletes (track and field) at the 2009 Summer Deaflympics
Athletes (track and field) at the 2013 Summer Deaflympics
Athletes (track and field) at the 2017 Summer Deaflympics
Medalists at the 2009 Summer Deaflympics
Medalists at the 2013 Summer Deaflympics
Medalists at the 2017 Summer Deaflympics
Sportspeople from Vestland